Abdur Rahim (1953 – 15 August 2021) was a Bangladesh Army officer who served  as the Director General of National Security Intelligence from 2001 to 2005.

Career
Rahim was commissioned in the Bangladesh Army in Comilla in 1975.

Charges and convictions
Rahim was charged in the 2004 Dhaka grenade attack. During Bangladesh Nationalist Party led government's tenure in 2004 he used to visit Hawa Bhaban. He was sentenced to death in the 10-Truck Arms and Ammunition Haul in Chittagong. He instructed NSI officials to supervise the offloading off arms in Chittagong Urea Fertilizer Limited jetty. He held several meetings with ARY Group and the ISI regarding the arms in Bangladesh and outside.

In October 2018, Rahim and 18 others were found guilty on charges of killing through common intention, planning and criminal conspiracy at the 2004 Dhaka grenade attack case. They were sentenced to death.

Rahim died on 15 August 2021, while under treatment for COVID-19 at the Shaheed Suhrawardy Medical College and Hospital, Dhaka, Bangladesh.  He was admitted to the hospital on 31 July, after he tested COVID-19 positive at Kashimpur Central Jail–2.

References

2021 deaths
Bangladesh Army generals
Directors General of National Security Intelligence
Bangladeshi male criminals
Bangladeshi prisoners sentenced to death
Deaths from the COVID-19 pandemic in Bangladesh
Place of birth missing
Date of birth missing
1953 births